Saint-Gérand-Croixanvec is a commune in the Morbihan department of Brittany in north-western France. It is close to the larger town of Pontivy.

It was established on 1 January 2022 from the amalgamation of the communes of Saint-Gérand and Croixanvec.

See also
Communes of the Morbihan department

References

Saintgerand
Communes nouvelles of Morbihan
2022 establishments in France

Populated places established in 2022